Marist College of Our Lady of Lourdes (Collège Notre Dame de Lourdes des Frères Maristes) is a comprehensive school, primary through baccalauréat, run by the Catholic Marist Brothers in the Byblos District northeast of Beirut, Lebanon. It traces its roots to a Marist training center opened in Amsheet town in Lebanon in 1903.

References  

Marist Brothers schools
Schools in Lebanon
Private schools in Lebanon
Educational institutions established in 1903
1903 establishments in the Ottoman Empire